Singampunari is a Panchayat Union in Sivagangai district, in Tamil Nadu, India. The town comes under Singampunari taluk.

History  
It was made up of military cantonments.

Geography

Climate  
Singampunari experiences dry weather for most of the year. In the past, a very dense jungle surrounded the place. It was watered by a river which was known in inscriptions as 'Vilisilai Aaru'.

Demographics

Population 
As of 2011 India census, Singampunari had a population of 18,143; males constitute 50% of the population and females 50%. Singampunari has an average literacy rate of 76%, higher than the national average of 59.5%: male literacy is 52%, and female literacy is 48%. In Singampuneri, 10.46% of the population is under 6 years of age.

Government and politics

Economy 
Singampunari is an industrial and temple town. It is the home for many groundnut oil mills and many more small scale industries. In Singampunari, the main industry is production of coconut rope. The sub regional office of Coir board is located in Singampunari which covers more than 10 districts. Tamil Nadu's first Coir Mega Cluster Programme is sanctioned for Singampunari. Singai Coirs Cluster is established in Manavottan village, A. Kalapur, Singampunari. Singampunari also constitutes an industrial estate in which South India's second largest forging plant MM forgings, LJ textiles, TeeLabs T-shirts, Tamil Nadu Gears and many auxiliary units are running successfully.

Culture/Cityscape

Landmarks 
Sevuga Perumal Ayyanar Temple

Transport

By Road  
Singampunari is about 47 km from Madurai, 58 km from Dindigul, 216 km from Coimbatore, 65 km from Tiruchi, 50 km from Karaikudi, 8 km from Nellukundupatti and 7 km from Kottampatti, which lies along the Madurai-Chennai highways. It also lies on the Coimbatore-Palani - Karaikudi - Devakottai route. So, all the buses from Coimbatore to Chettinad region via Palani stop in Singampunari.

Education 
There are Government elementary schools, middle schools, high schools, and one boys higher secondary school and a girls higher secondary school (Rani Mathurambal Rajayee Memorial govt. girls higher secondary school) with the strength of nearly 1500 pupils each. There are also five private English medium schools (Annai Velankanni Matric. Hr. Sec. School, Parivallal Matric. Hr. Sec. School, Venkateshwara Matric. Hr. Sec. School, S.S. Matriculation School and Karyonz School). One Teachers Training Institute (Madhavan Teacher Training Institute) is also available.

References

See also
 Mallakottai
 Piranmalai
 Ponnamaravathi

Resources

M.Arunpandi

History of Singampunari

Cities and towns in Sivaganga district